Stefan Dražić (born 14 August 1992) is a Serbian football forward, playing for Mezőkövesd.

Club career

Radnički Obrenovac
Dražić started playing football with FK Obrenovac 1905, and later was with Red Star Belgrade youth selections for 2 years. Next he returned in Obrenovac and joined Radnički, where he ended youth career, and after that he joined the first team for the 2008–09 season. He made 12 league appearances and scored 4 goals, although he was 16. After first senior season, he was more experienced, and he more constant in the first squad. For 2009–10 season, Dražić made 26 appearances and scored 6 goals. For the 2010–11 season, he made 28 appearances and scored 7 goals. He was nominated for man of the match 3 times. In new season, for the difference of previous he played one more match and scored one more goal, so he ended the 2011–12 season with 29 caps and 8 goals. The fifth season with club from Obrenovac was the best for Stefan Dražić. After 25 league goals in his previous career, for the 2012–13 season he scored 21 goals on 29 matches and was named as a man of the match 9 times with average rating 7.43.

Javor Ivanjica
Dražić was on trials and trained with Twente for 2 times as a member of Radnički Obrenovac, but he did not sign with club from Netherlands. He joined Javor Ivanjica in summer 2013, and scored his first goal for new club on his SuperLiga debut, against Red Star Belgrade. After that match Ifeanyi Onyilo transferred to Red Star Belgrade, and Dražić got more space in attack. Although Javor maybe had the best team than previous 10 years, the team was relegated to First League after the end of season. Dražić had 25 league appearances and scored 4 goals, and also played 1 cup match until the end of season. Behind the relegation from SuperLiga, Dražić definitely became the first choice as a centre forward, in new season, and he justified expectations, being the best scorer of Serbian First League in 2014–15 season with 13 goals. He had all 30 starts in league, and also played 1 cup match. Dražić and Ana Subotić were nominated for the best sportspeople of Ivanjica in 2014. Although some clubs interested for attacker, he started new season with the same club. He scored his first goal in 2015–16, in the 2nd fixture, against Spartak Subotica. Second goal in season he scored in away match against Voždovac in the 9th fixture. In 14th fixture, against Partizan, Dražić scored first goal on the match, but Javor lost that match. He was a scorer in a first semi-final cup match against Borac Čačak.

Voždovac
Dražić joined FK Voždovac in June 2016. He scored his first goal for new club in 2nd fixture of the 2016–17 Serbian SuperLiga season, against Rad. During the autumn same year, Dražić also scored a goal against Mladost Lučani on 20 August and against Inđija in a cup match played on 21 September 2016. After Ilija Stolica replaced Bratislav Živković as a coach of FK Voždovac, Dražić started next 2 matches from the bench. Returning in the first squad, Dražić scored a goal and noted an assist for a 2–1 victory in away match against Borac Čačak, played on 30 November 2016, being also nominated for player of the fixture. Dražić was elected as a man of the match in 4–1 victory against Vojvodina on 1 April 2017, scoring a goal and being fouled for a direct free kick. He also scored a goal in the next fixture match, against his ex-club Javor Ivanjica.

Mechelen
On 7 July 2017, Dražić signed a three-year contract with the Belgian side Mechelen. He scored on his debut for new club in 1–1 draw against Standard Liège on 30 July 2017.

Mezőkövesd
On 5 May 2018, he scored the first goal at the opening match of the Diósgyőri Stadion in the 2017–18 Nemzeti Bajnokság I season against Diósgyőri VTK.

Changchun Yatai
Dražić joined China League One club Changchun Yatai in July 2019, providing an assist on his debut, a 3-1 away victory over Nei Mongol Zhongyou.

Career statistics

Club

References

External links
 Stefan Dražić Stats at utakmica.rs
 
 
 

 

1992 births
Living people
Footballers from Belgrade
Association football forwards
Serbian footballers
FK Radnički Obrenovac players
FK Javor Ivanjica players
FK Voždovac players
Serbian First League players
Serbian SuperLiga players
Serbian expatriate footballers
Serbian expatriate sportspeople in Belgium
Serbian expatriate sportspeople in Hungary
Expatriate footballers in Belgium
Expatriate footballers in Hungary
K.V. Mechelen players
Mezőkövesdi SE footballers
Belgian Pro League players
Nemzeti Bajnokság I players
China League One players
Changchun Yatai F.C. players
Expatriate footballers in China
Diósgyőri VTK players